The 1948 Iowa State Cyclones football team represented Iowa State College of Agricultural and Mechanic Arts (later renamed Iowa State University) in the Big Seven Conference during the 1948 college football season. In their second year under head coach Abe Stuber, the Cyclones compiled a 4–6 record (2–4 against conference opponents), tied for fifth place in the conference, and were outscored by opponents by a combined total of 197 to 116. They played their home games at Clyde Williams Field in Ames, Iowa.

The team's statistical leaders included fullback Bill Chauncey with 428 rushing yards, quarterback Don Ferguson with 367 passing yards, left end Dean Laun with 225 receiving yards, and right halfback Bob Angle with 18 points (three touchdowns). Dean Laun was the only Iowa State player to be selected as a first-team all-conference player.

The team's regular starting lineup consisted of left end Dean Laun, left tackle Tom Southard, left guard Joe Brubaker, center Rod Rust, right guard Billy Myers, right tackle George Friedl, right end Dean Norman, quarterback Don Ferguson, left halfback Webb Halbert, right halfback Bob Angle, and fullback Bill Chauncey. Ray Klootwyk was the team captain.

Schedule

References

Iowa State
Iowa State Cyclones football seasons
Iowa State Cyclones football